The Chersky Range is a chain of mountains in northeastern Siberia between the Yana River and the Indigirka River. Administratively the area of the range belongs to the Sakha Republic, although a small section in the east is within Magadan Oblast. The range also includes important places of traditional Yakut culture, such as Ynnakh Mountain (Mat'-Gora) and kigilyakh rock formations. 

The Moma Natural Park is a  protected area  located in the southern zone of the range.

History
At some time between 1633 and 1642 Poznik Ivanov ascended a tributary of the lower Lena, crossed the Verkhoyansk Range to the upper Yana and then crossed the Chersky Range to the Indigirka. The range was sighted in 1926 by Sergei Obruchev (Vladimir Obruchev's son) and named by the Russian Geographical Society after the Polish explorer and geographer Ivan Chersky (or Jan Czerski).

Geography

The geographic boundaries of the mountain system are the Yana—Oymyakon Highlands in the southwest, the Upper Kolyma Highlands in the southeast and the Momo-Selennyakh Depression in the northeast.

Subranges
The system of the Chersky Range comprises a number of subranges running generally from northwest to southeast, including the following:

Between the Yana and Indigirka rivers:
Burkat Range, highest point 
Khadaranya Range, highest point 
Ymiysky Range, highest point 
Kisilyakh Range, highest point , by river Adycha
Tas-Khayakhtakh, highest point 
Kurundya Range, highest point  
Dogdo Range, highest point 
Chemalgin Range, highest point  
Yana-Oymyakon Highlands
Elgi Plateau (Эльгинское плоскогорье), highest point   
Oymyakon Plateau, highest point 
Yana Plateau, highest point 
Tirekhtyakh Range and Nelgesin Range, between the Adycha and Sartang rivers
In the upper Kolyma river basin:
Ulakhan-Chistay, highest point , near the southern end
Okhandya Range, highest point , the highest point of Magadan Oblast.
Cherge Range, highest point 
Angachak Range, highest point 
Arga-Tas, highest point 
Between the Chibagalakh and Adycha rivers
Chibagalakh Range, highest point 
Borong Range, highest point  (between the Charky and the Adycha)
Porozhny Range, highest point 
Silyap Range, highest point Mount Chyon (Гора Чён) 
Between the Indigirka and the Nera rivers:
Tas-Kystabyt, highest point 
Khalkansky Range, highest point , a southern prolongation of Tas-Kystabyt
Northeastern outliers

In some works, a few roughly parallel ranges located off the main system to the northeast, such as the Kyun-Tas Range (highest point ), the Selennyakh Range (highest point highest point Saltag-Tas, and the adjacent Moma Range (highest point ) with the Moma-Selennyakh Depression running along their western side, are included in the Chersky mountain system.

Other ranges of the system include the Irgichin Range, Inyalin Range, Volchan Range, Silen Range, Onel Range, Polyarny Range, Nendelgin Range, among others.

Hydrography
The Chersky System includes three main river basins:

Yana River - covering the western and northwestern parts of the mountain system. It includes rivers Oldzho and Adycha with its tributaries Tuostakh and Charky.
Indigirka River, covering the northeastern, central and southwestern parts of the system, with rivers Selennyakh, Moma and Nera among others.
Kolyma River, covering the eastern, southeastern and southern parts of the system, with rivers Zyryanka, Rassokha, Omulyovka, Yasachnaya, Taskan, Debin and Byoryolyokh, among others.

Some of the higher ranges with alpine relief have glaciers. There are also small lakes in the swampy valleys of some rivers, as well as lakes of glacial origin, such as Emanda and Tabanda

Tectonics
The range lies on the boundary between the Eurasian and North American tectonic plates.

The precise nature of the boundary between the North American and Eurasian tectonic plates in the area of the Chersky Range is still not fully understood and is the subject of ongoing research.  By the 1980s, the Chersky Range was considered mostly a zone of continental rifting where the crust was spreading apart.  However, the current view is that the Chersky Range is mostly an active suture zone, a continental convergent plate boundary, where compression is occurring as the two plates press against each other.  There is thought to be a point in the Chersky Range where the extensional forces coming from the north change to the compressional forces noted throughout most of the range.  The Chersky Range is also thought to include a geologic triple junction where the Ulakhan Fault intersects the suture zone.  Whatever the exact nature of the regional tectonics, the Chersky Range is a seismically active zone.  It connects in the north with the landward extension of the Laptev Sea Rift, itself a continental extension of the Mid-Arctic Gakkel Ridge.

Climate
The Chersky mountains, along with the neighboring Verkhoyansk Range, have a moderating effect on the climate of Siberia. The ridges obstruct west-moving air flows, decreasing the amount of snowfall in the plains to the west.

See also 
 Balagan-Tas
 Kigilyakh
 Nera Plateau

References

External links

Oymyakon Ring Structure in the North-Eastern Siberia
ХРЕБТ ЧЕРСКОГО (ЦЕПЬ ОБРУЧЕВА)
 
Plate tectonics
Tourist attractions in the Sakha Republic
East Siberian Mountains